Jane Watts born Jane Waldie (1793 – 1826) was a Scottish artist and author.

Life
Waldie was born in 1793, the daughter of George and Ann (born Ormston) Waldie of Hendersyde Park, Roxburghshire. Her elder sister, Charlotte Anne Eaton, was also a writer and artist.

Waldie painted local scenery and studied under Alexander Nasmyth. In September 1816 her brother John, her sister Charlotte and herself went abroad and returned the following August. In the October she married George Augustus Watts of Langton Grange near Staindrop. She and her sister, Charlotte, wrote an account of their visit to Belgium in 1815 which was published in 1817 under the title of Narrative of a Residence in Belgium, during the Campaign of 1815, and of a Visit to the Field of Waterloo. She wrote a four volume account of her travels before her marriage titled Sketches descriptive of Italy in 1816–17; with a brief Account of Travels in various parts of France and Switzerland.

The figures in some of her paintings were by Sir Robert Ker Porter, but she exhibited in her own name at Somerset House in 1819 a painting titled The Temple at Pæstum.

She died on 5 July 1826 shortly after her child. The painter Robert Edmonstone was asked to create a portrait of her which he did based on miniatures made whilst she was alive. Her husband took 28 pictures by her from Hendersyde Park where there was also a portrait of her made whilst she was in her twenties.

References

1793 births
1826 deaths
19th-century Scottish painters
19th-century Scottish women artists
People from Staindrop
Sibling artists